McKee Creek is a stream in the U.S. state of West Virginia.

McKee Creek was named after William McKee, a pioneer settler.

See also
List of rivers of West Virginia

References

Rivers of Nicholas County, West Virginia
Rivers of West Virginia